Field Adrianus Cate (born June 22, 1997) is an American actor and musician. He is best known his main role portraying young Ned in the fantasy comedy-drama Pushing Daisies (2007–2009). He is currently lead singer and guitarist of American rock trio Fencer.

Career 
Cate turned professional at the age of five, doing improvisational comedy, independent films, commercials, and other work. He also appears in Placebo's music video of "Song to Say Goodbye".

He worked in guest roles on various television series including Without a Trace and Cold Case. His most notable role was as Young Ned on ABC's Pushing Daisies becoming a regular cast member in season 2 and earning a Young Artist Award nomination in 2008. 

Raised a vegetarian, Cate spoke out on behalf of animal rights group PETA. He also supported groups such as Mattel Children's Hospital and served as a StarPower Ambassador for Starlight Children's Foundation.

In May 2017, his band Fencer released their first EP, With; and in February 2019, they released a music video for their single "Junebug." Their second EP, Growing Up Selfish, was released on November 1st, 2019.

Filmography

Television

References

External links 
 
 

American male child actors
1997 births
Living people
People from Burlington, Vermont
21st-century American male actors